Savika Chaiyadej, also spelled Sawika Chaiyadech (born 19 June 1986), nicknamed Pinky (พิ้งกี้), is a Thai actress and singer.

Early life and education
Chaiyadej was born on 19 June 1986, in Bangkok. She is of Chinese, English, Indian, Mon, Pakistani, and Thai heritage. She had an Islamic upbringing as her father is Muslim. Chaiyadej has two elder brothers, one of which was also in her first childhood lakorn. She graduated from Rangsit University with a bachelor's degree in Liberal Arts and later received a master's degree from Chalermkarnchana University.

Career
Chaiyadej has been in the entertainment business since she was around 8 years old, first seen in a Sony Trinitron commercial, appearing with an ape/gorilla. She rose to fame in her teenage years when she starred alongside Veerapaph Suparbpaiboon in the action adventure lakorn, Angkor 2, and portrayed as a princess who was cursed by a sorcerer.

Chaiyadej also works in the South Indian film industry. She made her debut in the 2011 Tamil film Markandeyan and played the female lead in the 2014 Telugu film, Emo Gurram Egaravachu opposite the popular star Sumanth which was released on 24 January 2014.

Lawsuit
On 18 August 2022, she and her mother Sarinya Chaiyadej, and her elder brother Surayuth Chaiydej were among 19 people arrested for allegedly defrauding people of money via a "Forex-3D scam". There are 9,824 victims in this case and the total damage value is 2.4 billion baht. The Criminal Court ruled against bail, Chiyadej and her mother were imprisoned at the Central Women's Penitentiary.

Filmography

Film

Television

MC 
 Television 
 2018 : Mai Taw Mae On Air MCOT HD (1/6/2018-30/9/2018)

 Online 
 2022 : [ YardKy Journey ] EP1 Teaser On Air YouTube:Pinky Savika Official

References

1986 births
Sawika Chaiyadech
Living people
Soap opera actresses
Sawika Chaiyadech
Sawika Chaiyadech
Sawika Chaiyadech
Sawika Chaiyadech
Sawika Chaiyadech
Sawika Chaiyadech
Sawika Chaiyadech
Sawika Chaiyadech
Sawika Chaiyadech
Sawika Chaiyadech
Sawika Chaiyadech
Sawika Chaiyadech
Sawika Chaiyadech
Sawika Chaiyadech
Sawika Chaiyadech
Sawika Chaiyadech
Sawika Chaiyadech
Sawika Chaiyadech